Baji is a kind of traditional Korean pant that is part of the hanbok. A baji is baggy and loose, so it is tied around the waist. In the past, Korean men wore baji as outer clothing, but for women, it gradually became part of the inner clothing. Today, women wear chima for their outer clothes.

References

Korean clothing
Trousers and shorts